Paola Ghirotti  (born February 2, 1955) is an Italian photographer. For more than twenty years thoroughly investigates the environment of Japanese traditions: unGiappone® is the trademark, which maintains Paola Ghirotti's pictorial archive, her writings and, her ongoing photographic exploration of traditional cultures.

Her work had been published – in Italy and abroad – in books and magazines, some of them becoming images of reference.

From 1990 to the 1994 she has been credited for the Formula One motor race, his last grand prix has been in Japan on April 17, 1994 at the TI Circuit, Aida

She edited the special edition of Limes bimonthly Italian geopolitical magazine "Japan: This mystery", which was published, to universal acclaim, in 2007

The ambassador of Japan in Italy had given her an official recognition for the expressions of solidarity and kindness towards the victims in Tohoku.

She is a member of AISTUGIA – Italian Association for Japanese Studies.

Criticism

There are universes so remote from our daily life that, once seen, strike us so compellingly that we have no choice but to yield
to their beauty, perfection, and purity. Paola's photographs, which
I'm not ashamed to say I'm madly in love with, possess the discreet power of that which is inevitable as well as the quiet violence of subtlety.
They say, "I am in the here and the now, in the purity of the moment." East, Japan of the mind

Books
 
il Giappone degli uomini mito, by Marco Panara, Giovanni Carrada, Paola Ghirotti, Armando Curcio, 1990
Le cronache del Caffè greco, Fratelli Palombi Editori, 1987
Il Vittoriano. Materiali per una storia, Fratelli Palombi, 1986–88
Franco Zagari, Giardino Italiano a Osaka, Edizioni Over 1990
un Giappone, Paola Ghirotti and Hori Yasue, Diego Mormorio, Marco Panara, Franco Zagari, Fratelli Palombi Editori, 1995  
 La via Crucis di Francesco Messina a San Giovanni Rotondo, by Monsignore Crispino Valenziano
 Le Japon des Japonais, Éditions Liana Lévi  
 le Maroc des Marocains, Éditions Liana Lévi  
 La Chine des Chinois, by Hania Arentsen and Paola Ghirotti, Éditions Liana Lévi  
 Japan: This mystery , the notebook Limes, The Gruppo Editoriale l'Espresso 2007.
Jidai Matsuri 1990-2020 archive photos by Paola Ghirotti, Casadei Libri, 2020

Exhibitions

1996 Roma – Una festa per gli occhi – La cultura del gusto, Akimoto Shigeru and Paola Ghirotti,
introduction of the exhibition by Fosco Maraini, Istituto Giapponese di Cultura Rome /The Japan Foundation
1996 Kyoto – Kyoto: details of spring and autumn, Goethe Institut Kansai   
1999 Roma – L'acqua in architettura, American Academy in Rome 
2001 Gifu  – Italia no bi, Japan no bi, The beauty of Italian and Japanese beauty. Fine art Museum   
2014 Roma – Ayrton Senna, at the speed of the heart 
2014 Ischia  – Ayrton Senna, at the speed of the heart  
2016 Minamisōma  – watashi wa wasurenai
2016 Urbino  – 日本の美、ウルビーノの美 Appunti di bellezza: Japan no bi, Urbino no bi  
2019 Gifu  – Watashi wa wasurenai

References

Official site Paola Ghirotti
Interview: La notte di Radio 1
Fondazione Italia Giappone, Paola Ghirotti Italia no bi Japan no bi: Italia-Giappone 2001
Interview by Lara de Angelis on book VoltiParole
un Giappone di Paola Ghirotti, mani 手, calendar 2012
MIstero Giappone
Tohoku 2011 – 2012 Do not forget – Paola Ghirotti / パオラ・ギロッティ
Isia Urbino, Immagini indelebili incontro con la fotografa Paola Ghirotti 
East, Japan of the mind photo essay Paola Ghirotti 
Ayrton Senna at the speed of the heart  
Ayrton Senna by Paola Ghirotti

Photographers from Rome
1955 births
Living people
Italian women photographers